Zmaj Children Games ( / Zmajeve dečije igre) is one of the biggest festivals for children in Serbia and the Novi Sad region. Named after Jovan Jovanović Zmaj, one of the most famous Serbian poets and writers of children's literature, the festival is held annually in June and December in Novi Sad, the capital of the Serbian province of Vojvodina.

The first festival was held in June 1958 under the name "Festival of literature for children, drama and puppet theatre" ("Фестивал дечије поезије, драме и луткарског позоришта"). Its organizer is Matica Srpska in Novi Sad. In 1969, the name was changed to Zmaj Children Games.

The main idea behind the festival is to gather writers, illustrators, critics, publishers, editors and readers of children's literature from Serbia and beyond. The Zmaj Children Games have their own publishing in the form of the magazine "Детињство" (Childhood) and hold a gathering of well respected children's literature authors in Zmaj Jovina Street 26.

Every June for a few days, children's plays, concerts, and shows gather children from Novi Sad and its surrounding region in Zmaj Jovina Street (the main street in Novi Sad's city centre).

See also
 Sremska Kamenica, Novi Sad neighborhood, home to the Zmaj museum in the home of Jovan Jovanović Zmaj.

External links
 Zmajeve Decje Igre (Official site)

Recurring events established in 1958
Children's festivals
Culture in Novi Sad
Tourism in Novi Sad
Festivals in Serbia